The Gufelstock is a mountain of the Glarus Alps, overlooking Schwanden in the canton of Glarus. The border with the canton of St. Gallen runs on the northern base of the mountain.

References

External links
 Gufelstock on Hikr

Mountains of the Alps
Mountains of Switzerland
Mountains of the canton of Glarus
Two-thousanders of Switzerland